The wedding of Guillaume, Hereditary Grand Duke of Luxembourg, and Countess Stéphanie de Lannoy took place on 19 and 20 October 2012. A civil ceremony was held on 19 October followed by a Roman Catholic wedding ceremony at Notre-Dame Cathedral in Luxembourg City the next day. The 2012 wedding marked the largest event for the Grand Ducal Family of Luxembourg and the country in years. More than 120 international media organisations requested accreditation for the event, including TV channels and newspapers from China, Morocco, Russia and the US. Guillaume was the last unmarried heir apparent of a monarchy in Europe prior to the wedding.

Background

The House of Nassau-Weilburg, which includes the Grand Ducal Family, has headed Luxembourg since 1890. Hereditary Grand Duke Guillaume is the heir apparent of his father, Grand Duke Henri.

Stéphanie de Lannoy is a member of a Belgian noble family, considered one of the oldest aristocratic families in Europe.

Guillaume and Stéphanie had known each other for many years. The couple began dating in 2009. They announced their engagement in April 2012. Prince Guillaume was 30 years old and Stéphanie was 28 years old at the time of their wedding.

Stéphanie's mother, Alix de Lannoy, died from a stroke on 26 August 2012, just two months before the grand ducal wedding.

The 2012 grand ducal wedding is estimated to have cost approximately 500,000 euros (US$650,000), paid with Luxembourgish taxes. The two-day ceremony included public street fairs, fireworks, and free concerts, all open to the public.

Stephanie's change of citizenship was expedited prior to the wedding, which caused some controversy within Luxembourg. She became a naturalized Luxembourger 19 October 2012.

Ceremony

Civil ceremony
Prince Guillaume and Countess Stéphanie were married in a small civil ceremony on 19 October 2012, conducted by Luxembourg Mayor Xavier Bettel.

A white tie gala dinner was held that evening at the Grand Ducal Palace.

Religious ceremony
The more elaborate, Catholic wedding ceremony was held in Notre-Dame Cathedral the next day. The ceremony, which began shortly after 11:00 a.m. on 20 October, was officiated by Archbishop Jean-Claude Hollerich of the Roman Catholic Archdiocese of Luxembourg. The weather on the day of the ceremony was described as "unseasonably warm." Stéphanie was escorted into the Cathedral by her eldest brother, Count Jehan. Hereditary Grand Duke Guillaume arrived at the ceremony with his mother, Grand Duchess Maria Teresa of Luxembourg.

The bride and groom exchanged wedding rings crafted entirely from fair trade gold.

The couple exchanged a public kiss before a crowd of well-wishers on the balcony of the Grand Ducal Palace after the ceremony.

Wedding attire
Countess Stéphanie's wedding dress was designed by Lebanese fashion designer Elie Saab. The dress was described as an "ivory lace dress embroidered with silver filigree" with "three-quarter length sleeves." Her dress was accompanied by a silk tulle veil, featuring a motif of silver floral designs trailing thirteen feet behind her  and the Lannoy family tiara.

Prince Guillaume wore a Luxembourgish military uniform.

Bridal attendants
The bridal attendants were the bridegroom's sister, nephew and second cousin, and nieces and nephew of the bride:
 Princess Alexandra of Luxembourg
 Antonia Hamilton
 Prince Gabriel of Nassau
 Countess Caroline de Lannoy
 Countess Louise de Lannoy
 Isaure de le Court
 Lancelot de le Court
 Madeleine Hamilton

Guests

Relatives of the groom

Grand Ducal Family of Luxembourg
 Grand Duke Jean, the groom's paternal grandfather
 The Grand Duke and Grand Duchess, the groom's parents
 Prince Félix and Claire Lademacher, the groom's brother and his girlfriend
 Prince Louis and Princess Tessy, the groom's brother and sister-in-law
 Prince Gabriel of Nassau, the groom's nephew
 Prince Noah of Nassau, the groom's nephew
 Princess Alexandra, the groom's sister
 Prince Sébastien, the groom's brother
 Archduchess Marie-Astrid and Archduke Carl Christian of Austria, the groom's paternal aunt and uncle
 Archduchess Marie Christine and Count Rodolphe of Limburg-Stirum, the groom's first cousin and her husband
 Archduke Imre and Archduchess Kathleen of Austria, the groom's first cousin and his wife
 Archduke Cristoph of Austria and Adélaïde Drapé-Frisch, the groom's first cousin and his fiancée
 Archduke Alexander of Austria, the groom's first cousin
 Archduchess Gabriella of Austria, the groom's first cousin
 Prince Jean and Countess Diane of Nassau, the paternal uncle and aunt
 Princess Marie-Gabrielle of Nassau, the groom's first cousin
 Prince Constantin of Nassau, the groom's first cousin
 Prince Wenceslas of Nassau, the groom's first cousin
 Prince Carl-Johan of Nassau, the groom's first cousin
 Princess Margaretha and Prince Nikolaus of Liechtenstein, the groom's paternal aunt and uncle
 Princess Maria-Anunciata of Liechtenstein, the groom's first cousin
 Princess Marie-Astrid of Liechtenstein, the groom's first cousin
 Prince Josef-Emanuel of Liechtenstein, the groom's first cousin
 Prince Guillaume and Princess Sibilla, the groom's paternal uncle and aunt
 Prince Paul Louis of Nassau, the groom's first cousin
 Prince Léopold of Nassau, the groom's first cousin
 Princess Charlotte of Nassau, the groom's first cousin
 Prince Jean of Nassau, the groom's first cousin

Extended family
 Descendants of Princess Elisabeth, Duchess of Hohenberg, the groom's paternal grandaunt:
 Princess Anna of Hohenberg and Count Andreas of Bardeau, the groom's first cousin once removed, and her husband
 Princess Sophie of Hohenberg and Jean-Louis de Potesta, the groom's first cousin once removed, and her husband
 Descendants of Princess Marie-Adélaïde, Countess Henckel von Donnersmarck, the groom's paternal grandaunt:
 Countess Charlotte Henckel and Count Christoph Johannes von Meran, the groom's first cousin once removed, and her husband
 Descendants of Princess Marie Gabriele, Dowager Countess of Holstein-Ledreborg, the groom's paternal grandaunt:
 Countess Lydia of Holstein-Ledreborg, the groom's first cousin once removed 
 Countess Veronica of Holstein-Ledreborg, the groom's first cousin once removed 
 Countess Silvia of Holstein-Ledreborg and John Munro, the groom's first cousin once removed, and her husband
 Countess Antonia of Holstein-Ledreborg, the groom's first cousin once removed 
 Descendants of Prince Charles of Luxembourg, the groom's paternal granduncle
 Princess Charlotte and Marc-Victor Cunningham, the groom's first cousin once removed, and her husband
 Prince Robert and Princess Julie, the groom's first cousin once removed, and his wife
 The Dowager Princess of Ligne, the groom's paternal grandaunt
 The Prince and Princess of Ligne, the groom's first cousin once removed, and his wife
 Princess Alix de Ligne, the groom's second cousin
 Prince and Princess Wauthier de Ligne, the groom's first cousin once removed, and his wife
 Princess Elisabeth-Eleonore and Baron Baudouin Gillès de Pelichy, the groom's second cousin and her husband
 Princess Anne and Charles de Fabribeckers de Cortils et Grâce, the groom's first cousin once removed, and his wife
 Princess Christine and Prince Antônio of Orléans-Braganza, the groom's first cousin once removed, and her husband
 Princess Sophie, Countess Philippe de Nicolay, the groom's first cousin once removed
 Prince and Princess Antoine-Lamoral de Ligne, the groom's first cousin once removed, and his wife
 Princess Yolande and Hugo Townshend, the groom's first cousin once removed, and her husband
 Hélène Vestur, former wife of Prince Jean

Mestre family
 Luis and Nicole Mestre, the groom's maternal uncle and aunt
 Maike Mestre, the groom's first cousin
 Luis Mestre, the groom's cousin 
 Antonio Mestre, the groom's maternal uncle
 Catalina Esteve, the groom's maternal aunt
 Natalia Esteve, the groom's cousin
 Katarina Esteve, the groom's cousin
 Victoria Esteve, the groom's cousin

Relatives of the bride

de Lannoy family
 The Count de Lannoy, the bride's father
 Count Jehan de Lannoy, the bride's brother
 Countess Caroline de Lannoy, the bride's niece
 Countess Louise de Lannoy, the bride's niece
 Count Christian and Countess Luisa de Lannoy, the bride's brother and sister-in-law
 Countess Nathalie and John Hamilton, the bride's sister and brother-in-law
 Antonia Hamilton, the bride's niece
 Charlotte Hamilton, the bride's niece
 Madeleine Hamilton, the bride's niece
 Countess Gaëlle de Lannoy, the bride's sister
 Count Amaury de Lannoy, the bride's brother
 Count Olivier and Countess Alice de Lannoy, the bride's brother and sister-in-law
 Countess Isabelle and Jean-Charles de le Court, the bride's sister and brother-in-law
 Isaure de le Court, the bride's niece
 Lancelot de le Court, the bride's nephew 
 Countess Chantal de Lannoy, the bride's paternal aunt
 Countess Christine and Count Bruno de Limburg Stirum, the bride's first cousin and her husband
 Countess Isabelle de Lannoy, the bride's paternal aunt
 Count Claude and Countess Claudine de Lannoy, the bride's paternal uncle and aunt

della Faille de Leverghem family
 Ladislas and Anne della Faille de Leverghem, the bride's maternal uncle and aunt
 Lydia and Dominique de Schaetzen, the bride's maternal aunt and uncle
 Dominique and Claude della Faille de Lerverghem, the bride's maternal uncle and aunt
 Arnaud and Marie-Pascale della Faille de Lerverghem, the bride's maternal uncle and aunt

Foreign royal guests

Members of reigning royal families
  Queen Fabiola of Belgium, the groom's paternal grandaunt by marriage 
  The King and Queen of the Belgians, the groom's paternal granduncle and grandaunt
  The Duke and Duchess of Brabant, the groom's first cousin once removed, and his wife
  The Archduchess and Archduke of Austria-Este, the groom's first cousin once removed, and second cousin, once removed
  Prince Amedeo of Belgium, the groom's second cousin
  Prince Laurent and Princess Claire of Belgium, the groom's first cousin once removed, and his wife
  The Queen and Prince Consort of Denmark, the groom's second cousin twice removed, and her husband
  The Crown Prince and Crown Princess of Denmark, the groom's third cousin once removed, and his wife
  Count Axel and Countess Jutta of Rosenborg, the groom's second cousin once removed, and his wife
  The Crown Prince of Japan (representing the Emperor of Japan)
  Prince Hassan bin Talal and Princess Sarvath al-Hassan of Jordan (representing the King of Jordan)
  Prince Rashid bin Hassan and Princess Zeina al-Rashid of Jordan
  The Prince and Princess of Liechtenstein, the groom's third cousin once removed, and his wife
  Princess Isabelle of Liechtenstein, wife of the groom's third cousin once removed
  Prince Wenzeslaus of Liechtenstein, the groom's fourth cousin
  The Dowager Marchioness of Mariño, the groom's third cousin once removed
  The Princess of Hanover, wife of the groom's third cousin twice removed (representing the Prince of Monaco)
  The Princess Consort of Marocco (representing the King of Morocco) 
  The Queen of the Netherlands, the groom's fourth cousin once removed
  The Prince of Orange and Princess Máxima of the Netherlands, the groom's fifth cousin and his wife
  The King and Queen of Norway, the groom's first cousin twice removed, and his wife
  Princess Märtha Louise of Norway, the groom's second cousin once removed
  The Crown Prince and Crown Princess of Norway, the groom's second cousin once removed, and his wife
  Sheikha Al-Mayassa bint Hamad bin Khalifa Al-Thani of Qatar (representing the Emir of Qatar)
  Sheikh Hamad bin Jassim bin Jaber bin Mohammed bin Thani Al Thani of Qatar
  The Prince and Princess of Asturias, the groom's fourth cousin once removed, and his wife (representing the King of Spain) 
  The Queen of Sweden, wife of the groom's third cousin once removed (representing the King of Sweden)
  The Crown Princess of Sweden and The Duke of Västergötland, the groom's fourth cousin and her husband
  The Duke of Värmland, the groom's fourth cousin
  The Earl and Countess of Wessex, the groom's third cousin twice removed, and his wife (representing the Queen of the United Kingdom)

Members of non-reigning royal families
 Archduchess Maria Beatrice, Countess Riprand von und zu Arco-Zinneberg, the groom's second cousin once removed
 Countess Anna von und zu Arco-Zinneberg, the groom's third cousin
 Countess Olympia von und zu Arco-Zinneberg, the groom's third cousin
 Archduke Martin and Archduchess Katharina of Austria-Este, the groom's second cousin once removed, and his wife
 Archduchess Isabella and Count Andrea Czarnocki-Lucheschi, the groom's second cousin once removed, and her husband
 Archduke István and Archduchess Paola of Austria, the groom's second cousin once removed, and his wife
 Archduchess Yolande of Austria, widow of the groom's first cousin twice removed
 Archduke Rudolf and Archduchess Marie-Hélène of Austria, the groom's second cousin once removed
 Archduchess Priscilla of Austria, the groom's third cousin
 Archduchess Anna Gabriele of Austria, widow of the groom's first cousin twice removed
 Archduchess Maria Anna and Prince Peter Galitzine, the groom's second cousin once removed, and her husband
 Archduke Karl Peter and Archduchess Alexandra of Austria, the groom's second cousin once removed, and his wife
 Archduke Simeon and Archduchess María of Austria, the groom's second cousin once removed, and his wife
 Archduchess Catharina-Maria of Austria and Count Massimiliano Secco d'Aragona, the groom's second cousin once removed, and her husband
 Archduke Michael and Archduchess Christiana of Austria, the groom's fourth cousin once removed, and his wife
 Archduchess Sophie and The Prince of Windisch-Graetz, the groom's fourth cousin once removed, and her husband
 The Margrave and Margravine of Baden, the groom's third cousins twice removed
 The Hereditary Prince and Hereditary Princess of Baden, the groom's fourth cousin once removed, and his wife
 The Duke and Duchess in Bavaria, the groom's second cousin twice removed, and his wife
 Prince Ludwig of Bavaria, the groom's third cousin
 The Dowager Duchess of Croÿ, the groom's first cousin twice removed
 The Duke and Duchess of Croÿ, the groom's second cousin once removed, and his wife
 The Duke and Duchess of Parma, the groom's second cousin once removed, and his wife
 Princess Marie Françoise of Lobkowicz, the groom's first cousin twice removed
 Prince Charles-Henri of Lobkowicz, the groom's second cousin once removed
 Tsar Simeon II and Tsarina Margarita of the Bulgarians, the groom's half-second cousin once removed, and his wife
 The Princess of Turnovo, wife of the groom's half-third cousin
 The Prince of Preslav, the groom's half-third cousin
 The Duke and Duchess of Vendôme, the groom's fourth cousin and his wife
 The Prince Napoléon, the groom's fourth cousin once removed
 King Constantine II and Queen Anne-Marie of Greece, the groom's third cousin twice removed, and second cousin twice removed
 Crown Prince Pavlos and Crown Princess Marie-Chantal of Greece, the groom's third cousin once removed, and his wife
 The Prince and Princess of Venice,  the groom's second cousin once removed, and his wife
 The Princess and Prince of Löwenstein-Wertheim-Rosenberg, the groom's fifth cousin twice removed, and her husband
 The Duke and Duchess of Braganza, the groom's second cousin twice removed, and his wife
 The Prince of Prussia, the groom's sixth cousin, once removed
 Princess Alexandra and Count Jefferson von Pfeil und Klein-Ellguth, the groom's third cousin once removed, and her husband
 The Prince and Princess of Sayn-Wittgenstein-Sayn
 Crown Princess Margareta and Prince Radu of Romania, the groom's second cousin once removed, and her husband
 The Princess of Waldburg zu Zeil und Trauchburg
 Crown Prince Alexander and Crown Princess Katherine of Yugoslavia, the groom's fourth cousin once removed, and his wife

Nobility
 Princess Dainé d'Arenberg 
  The Lady Brabourne
  The Hon. Alexandra Knatchbull
  The Prince and Princess de Mérode
  Princess Blanche and Baron Philipp von und zu Bodman
 The Prince and Princess of Stolberg-Stolberg
 Princess Louise of Stolberg-Stolberg

Other notable guests
 Jean-Claude Juncker, Prime Minister of Luxembourg
 Xavier Bettel, Mayor of Luxembourg City, and his partner
 José Manuel Barroso, President of the European Commission

Approximately 270 citizens of the Grand Duchy of Luxembourg attended the wedding ceremony.

References

External links
 The Royal Wedding at luxembourg.lu

2012 in Luxembourg
Luxembourgish monarchy
Luxembourg
Notre-Dame Cathedral, Luxembourg
2010s in Luxembourg City
October 2012 events in Europe
Guillaume, Hereditary Grand Duke of Luxembourg, and Countess Stéphanie de Lannoy